Bangladesh Hi-tech Park Authority (BHTPA) is a government agency in Bangladesh dedicated to establish, manage and operate technology business parks throughout the country.

History 
Formed in 2010, BHTPA is now implementing the projects including the Kaliakoir Hi-Tech Park in Gazipur District and Jessore Software Technology Park. Planned projects include Mohakhali IT Village in Dhaka, Barendra Silicon City in Paba Upazila of Rajshahi District, and Sylhet Electronic City in Companiganj Upazila, Sylhet. BHTPA is also approving private hi-tech park to implemented by private companies. Thus far, 39 hi-tech parks have been under constructions and approved for construction by BHTPA in different regions in Bangladesh.

Vision & Mission

Vision: Sustainable development & proliferation of IT/Hi-Tech industry in Bangladesh.

Mission: Establish international standard infrastructure; create congenial & sustainable business environment; develop IT/ITES based Industrial ecosystem and ensure all services for IT/ITES business & industries through One Stop Platform.

List of Hi-Tech Parks in Bangladesh 

 Bangabandhu Hi-Tech City in Kaliakoir
 Sheikh Hasina Software Technology Park in Jessore
 Janata Tower Software Technology Park in Tejgaon
 Seikh Kamal IT Training & Incubation Center, Natore 
 Bangabandhu Sheikh Mujib Hi-Tech Park, Rajshahi
 Sheikh Kamal IT Training and Incubation Center, Chittagong
 Bangabandhu Sheikh Mujib Hi-Tech Park, Sylhet -- under construction
 Bangabandhu Sheikh Mujib Hi-Tech Park, Khulna -- under construction
 Sheikh Kamal IT Training & Incubation Center, Magura -- under construction
 Mohakhali IT Village -- under construction
 Barendra Silicon City -- under construction
 Mymensingh Hi-Tech Park --approved
 Jamalpur Hi-Tech Park --approved
 Keraniganj Hi-Tech Park --approved
 Comilla Hi-Tech Park --approved
 Barisal Hi-Tech Park --approved
 Cox's Bazar Hi-Tech Park --approved
 Gopalganj Hi-Tech Park --approved
 Bangladesh Bharot Digital Service and Employment Training (BDSET) Center --approved
 Minister Hi-Tech Park in Gazipur
 City Hi-Tech Park in Demra, Dhaka -- under construction

See also 
 Software Technology Parks of Bangladesh

References

External links
 Official site

2010 establishments in Bangladesh
Science and technology in Bangladesh
Industry in Bangladesh
Business parks